The Gladiator is a made-for-TV vigilante-action film directed by Abel Ferrara and starring Ken Wahl, Nancy Allen & Brian Robbins. Robert Culp, Stan Shaw & Rick Dees have supporting roles. Although originally intended for theatrical release, the film was purchased by Showtime Networks and aired on ABC Television as an original film.

Plot
A homicidal maniac is on the loose in Los Angeles, killing motorists at random with his "death car". After losing his brother Jeff to the twisted assassin known as "Skull", Rick Benton takes it upon himself to hunt down the reckless drivers that fill the streets at night. Being a master mechanic, Rick spends his time converting his pick-up truck into an armed and dangerous vehicle. With speed to take on the fastest car and strength to make sure in a one-on-one situation, he will be the only survivor. The cops soon find out about the vigilante known only as the "Gladiator" and do all they can to catch him before his citizen's arrests go one step too far.

Cast
 Ken Wahl as Rick Benton / the Gladiator
 Nancy Allen as Susan Neville
 Brian Robbins as Jeff Benton
 Robert Culp as Lieutenant Frank Mason
 Stan Shaw as Joe Barker
 Rosemary Forsyth as Loretta Simpson
 Bart Braverman as Dan
 Rick Dees as Garth Masters
 Michael Young as Reporter
 Garry Goodrow as Cadillac Drunk
 Robert Phalen as Dr. Maxwell
 Linda Thorson as Woman in Class
 Harry Beer as Franklin

References

External links
 

1986 television films
1986 films
1986 action films
1986 independent films
1980s American films
1980s English-language films
1980s vigilante films
ABC network original films
American action television films
American independent films
American vigilante films
Films directed by Abel Ferrara
Films scored by David Michael Frank
New World Pictures films